A motorjet is a rudimentary type of jet engine which is sometimes referred to as thermojet, a term now commonly used to describe a particular and completely unrelated pulsejet design.

Design 

At the heart the motorjet is an ordinary piston engine (hence, the term motor), but instead of (or sometimes, as well as) driving a propeller, it drives a compressor. The compressed air is channeled into a combustion chamber, where fuel is injected and ignited. The high temperatures generated by the combustion cause the gases in the chamber to expand and escape at high velocity from the exhaust, creating a thermal reactive force that provides useful thrust.

Motorjet engines provide greater thrust than a propeller alone mounted on a piston engine; this has been successfully demonstrated in a number of different aircraft. A jet engine also can provide thrust at higher speeds where a propeller becomes less efficient or even ineffective; in fact, a jet engine gains efficiency as speed rises, while a propeller loses it (outside of a certain design range). This gives better efficiency in either operating range than an aircraft powered by just a propeller or a jet. The same is true of the dual-powerplant aircraft experimented with after the turbojet became practicable, which were equipped with both a piston-driven propeller and a turbojet engine.

History 

 In 1908 French inventor René Lorin proposed using a piston engine to compress air that would then be mixed with fuel and burned to produce pulses of hot gas that would be expelled through a nozzle to generate a propelling force.
 In 1917, O. Morize of Chateaudun, France, proposed the Morize ejector scheme in which a reciprocating engine drove a compressor supplying air to a liquid-fueled combustion chamber which discharged into a convergent-divergent tube and ultimately out into the atmosphere.
 The term "motor jet" was established in a patent filed in Britain by J.H. Harris of Esher, U.K., in 1917.
 It was next explored by Secondo Campini in the early 1930s, although it was not until 1940 that an aircraft, the Caproni Campini N.1 (sometimes referred to as C.C.2), would fly powered by his engine.  Campini used the term thermojet at this time to describe his motorjet.
 NACA engineer Eastman Jacobs was actively pursuing thermojet research in the early 1940s for a project that came to be known as Jake's jeep which was never completed as turbojet technology overtook it.
 Japanese engineers developed the Tsu-11 motorjet engine to power Ohka aircraft as an alternative to the solid-fuel rocket engines that these aircraft were then using.
 The Soviet Mikoyan-Gurevich I-250 designed in 1944 used a piston engine to drive both a propeller at the nose of the plane, and a motorjet compressor leading to a jet exhaust at the tail. Between 10 and 50 I-250 (a.k.a. MiG-13) aircraft were produced, serviced, and flown by the Soviet Navy through 1950. A similar Sukhoi Su-5 plane had been designed, but never produced.

Motorjet research was nearly abandoned at the end of World War II as the turbojet was a more practical solution to jet power as it used the jet exhaust to drive a gas turbine, providing the power to drive the compressor without the additional weight of a piston engine that generated no thrust. One of the primary advantages of the motorjet layout was that the reciprocating engine provided power for the compressor and no turbine power section was needed. However, metallurgy and understanding of the design of turbines had advanced to a point after World War II where it was feasible to create a turbine to operate reliably in the high-velocity hot-gas environment downstream of the combustor, and the motorjet idea lost focus.

See also
 Luigi Stipa
 Stipa-Caproni

Notes

External links
 A motorjet history and research webpage
 Nye Thermodynamics Thermojet

Jet engines